Vikingligr Veldi (Norse meaning roughly In the Veld of the Vikings or "In the Viking Veld") is the debut studio album by Norwegian heavy metal band Enslaved. It was released in 1994, through Deathlike Silence Productions, the record label run by Euronymous, who was murdered before the album's release. The album is dedicated to him.

Despite Enslaved's nationality, the lyrics on this album are mainly in Icelandic, perhaps due to its resemblance to Old Norse. The lyrics of "Heimdallr", however, are in Old Norwegian. The distinct cover features the Anglo-Saxon helmet uncovered at the Sutton Hoo site in England, widely identified with the 7th-century king Rædwald of East Anglia.

Guitarist and keyboardist Ivar Bjørnson was just 15 years old when Vikingligr Veldi was recorded.

Track listing

Critical reception 

AllMusic wrote, "Vikingligr Veldi [...] proved that [...] Enslaved were ready to carry on the torch of Norwegian black metal beyond the shocking demise of its original ringleader [Euronymous]", calling it "an album that stands the test of time, for the most part, and remains of crucial importance to the black metal genre."

Personnel 

 Enslaved

 Grutle Kjellson – bass guitar, vocals, production, mixing
 Ivar Bjørnson – guitar, keyboards, electronics, piano, production, mixing
 Trym Torson – drums, production, mixing

 Production

 Pytten (Eirik Hundvin) – production, recording, mixing, engineering
 Davide Bertolini – recording, engineering
 Padde – mixing

References

External links 

 

Enslaved (band) albums
1994 debut albums